Gareth Roberts may refer to:

Gareth Roberts (physicist) (1940–2007), British physicist, engineer, and President of Wolfson College, Oxford
Gareth Roberts (rugby union) (born 1959), Welsh rugby player
Gareth Roberts (writer) (born 1968), British television writer
Gareth Roberts (footballer) (born 1978), Welsh football player
Gareth Roberts (statistician) (born 1964), British professor and Director of the Centre for Research in Statistical Methodology at University of Warwick
Gareth Roberts (co-driver) (1987–2012), Welsh rally co-driver

See also
Garreth Roberts (born 1960), English footballer